Michael Tronick (born March 2, 1949) is an American film editor with more than 25 film credits. He has been nominated twice for American Cinema Editors "Eddie" Awards for Scent of a Woman (1992) and for Hairspray (2007).

Since 2012, Tronick has served as a member of the board of governors of the Academy of Motion Picture Arts and Sciences Editors Branch.

Tronick is a member of the academy's Science and Technology Council and was previously selected for membership in the American Cinema Editors.

Filmography
This filmography is a compilation of Tronick's credits as an editor.
 Streets of Fire (1984) (with James Coblentz, Freeman A. Davies and Michael Ripps)
 Beverly Hills Cop II (1987) (with Chris Lebenzon and Billy Weber)
 Less than Zero (1987) (with Peter Berger)
 Midnight Run (1988) (with Chris Lebenzon and Billy Weber)
 Revenge (1990) (with Chris Lebenzon) (film editor)
 Days of Thunder (1990) (with Robert C. Jones, Chris Lebenzon, Bert Lovitt, Stuart Waks and Billy Weber)
 The Adventures of Ford Fairlane (1990)
 The Marrying Man (1991) (with Michael Jablow and Michael R. Miller)
 F/X2 (1991) (additional editor)
 Hudson Hawk (1991) (with Chris Lebenzon)
 The Last Boy Scout (1991) (additional editor)
 Scent of a Woman (1992) (with Harvey Rosenstock and William Steinkamp)
 Straight Talk (1992)
 True Romance (1993) (with Christian Wagner)
 The Cowboy Way (1994)
 Little Giants (1994) (with Donn Cambern and Jonathan P. Shaw)
 Under Siege 2: Dark Territory (1995)
 Eraser (1996)
 Volcano (1997)
 Meet Joe Black (1998) (with Joe Hutshing)
 Blue Streak (1999)
 Remember the Titans (2000)
 American Outlaws (2001)
 The Scorpion King (2002)
 S.W.A.T. (2003)
 Mr. & Mrs. Smith (2005)
 Hairspray (2007)
 Gone Baby Gone (2007) (additional editor)
 Hannah Montana & Miley Cyrus: Best of Both Worlds Concert (2008)
 Iron Man (2008) (additional editor)
 Bedtime Stories (2008) (with Tom Costain)
 Jonas Brothers: The 3D Concert Experience (2009)
 The Wolfman (2010) (additional editor)
 The Green Hornet (2011)
 Battle: Los Angeles (2011) (additional editor)
 New Year's Eve (2011)
 Act of Valor (2012) (with Scott Waugh)
 2 Guns (2013)
 Unfinished Business (2015) (with Jon Poll and Peter Teschner)
 The 33 (2015)
 Straight Outta Compton (2015) (with Billy Fox)
 Warcraft (2016) (additional editor)
 Suicide Squad (2016) (editor)
 Ben-Hur (2016) (additional editor)
 Bright (2017)
 Tomb Raider (2018) (with Stuart Baird)
 Outlaw King (2018) (post-production consultant)

References

External links 

 

American Cinema Editors
Living people
American film editors
1949 births